Isotrias joannisana is a species of moth of the family Tortricidae. It is found in central and southern Italy. There are also records for France and Spain.

The wingspan is 16–17 mm.

References

Moths described in 1921
Polyorthini
Moths of Europe